Indian National Electricity Workers' Federation is a trade union in India, affiliated to the Indian National Trade Union Congress that organises electricity workers.
 It had a reported membership of 170,000 in 1970.

References

Trade unions in India
Indian National Trade Union Congress